Arnaldo Ferraguti (1862-1925) was an Italian painter and illustratory, often painting genre subjects.

History
He was born in Ferrara but trained at the Accademia di Belle Arti of Naples, then under the leadership of Domenico Morelli. He befriended  the painter Francesco Paolo Michetti and his circle at Francavilla al Mare.

In 1891, he married Olga Treves, granddaughter of the editors Emilio and Giuseppe Treves. He erected a villa in Pallanza where he taught painting, and attended salons in the nearby Villa Cordelia of Giuseppe Treves. He died in Forlì in 1925.

Works
In 1887, he exhibited a series of pastel studies in Venice.

Starting in 1890, he submitted his masterwork: a massive (nearly 6 by 3 meter) canvas Alla vanga to various exhibitions, to praise and awards. The canvas depicts a line of peasants, from children to elders, including some barefoot women and children, breaking the soil with spades while nearby the supervisor talks to peasant working women.<ref>Alla Vanga is now on display at the Museo del Paesaggio in Verbania-Pallanza.</ref> The scene trumpets a clear affection for the hard-laboring proletarian farmers. It can be contrasted to the less romanticized The Fourth Estate painting (1901) by Giuseppe Pellizza da Volpedo, which portrays workers with no pastoral embellishment.

Other works by Ferraguti include paintings and illustrations for books Illustrations for Cuoreby Edmondo De Amicis; Illustrations for Vita dei Campi by Giovanni Verga; in addition canvases depicting Madre; Vespero; Bivio; and Prima e poi''.

Gallery

References

1862 births
1929 deaths
19th-century Italian painters
Italian male painters
20th-century Italian painters
Painters from Naples
Accademia di Belle Arti di Napoli alumni
19th-century Italian male artists
20th-century Italian male artists